William Ladd Taylor (1854-1926) was an American illustrator.

Biography
William Ladd Taylor was born at Grafton, Massachusetts on December 10, 1854. He studied art in Boston and New York, and in Paris under Boulanger and Lefebvre in 1884–85.  His drawings, many of which first appeared in magazines, are essentially narrative in type and show keen understanding of human nature, with careful, historical accuracy. He published several volumes of his work which contained illustrations of the nineteenth century in New England, the pioneer West, Longfellow, the Psalms, old songs, American life, American literature, and the Old Testament.

He married Mary Alice Fitz in 1888.

His work was featured in the magazine the Ladies Home Journal, from 1895; the office also exhibited his oils and water-colours and sold reproductions of these.

Gallery

References

External links

 
 

1854 births
1926 deaths
American illustrators
People from Grafton, Massachusetts
Artists from Massachusetts